Sameer Tanti (born 6 February 1955) is an Assamese language poet from India. He is the 2012 winner of the  Assam Valley Literary Award.

Biography
Sameer Tant was born on 6 February 1955 at Behora, Mikirchang tea estate in the Karbi Anglong district of Assam, India. He studied at Bihora Mikirchang P
primary school in Golaghat, higher secondary from Haflong Government College, graduation in English literature from Dergaon college and Master's degree in English from Gauhati University in 1983. He worked as a faculty member at Saraighat College before working as a translator with an English daily newspaper in Guwahati and then as a tourist information officer in the Department of Tourism, Government of Assam.

Works
Sameer Tanti has written fourteen poetry books, four critical essays, and two translations of African and Japanese books. he has also edited two short story collections. In his works he strives to bridge the growing disparity among different sections of society. He has presented his poetry at several international forums like Indian Poetry Festival (1987), Asian Poetry Festival (1988) and World Poetry Festival (1989).

Awards
 2012 :- Assam Valley Literary Award
 2016 :- Padmanath Vidyabinod Literary Award
 2017 :- Ramanath Bhattacharya Foundation Literary Award
 2019 :- Shortlisted for Sahitya Akademi Award for his book "Kayakolper Bela"

Bibliography
 1985 :- Yuddha Bhumir Kabitaa
 Shokakul Upatyaka
 Tej Andhaaror Nao
 Somoy, Sabda, Sapon
 2001 :- Kadam Phular Raati
 2012 :- Ananda Aru Bedonaar Baivab
 2013 :- Bishad Sangeet

References 

1955 births

Living people

Assamese-language writers

Writers from Assam
Poets from Assam
Indian male poets
20th-century Indian poets
Indian magazine editors
20th-century Indian male writers
Gauhati University alumni
Jibanananda Das Award
Assam Valley Literary Award